Eivind Lühr Tonna (born 19 February 1975) is a Norwegian ski-orienteering competitor. He received a silver medal in the relay event at the 2004 World Ski Orienteering Championships in Östersund, together with Øystein Kvaal Østerbø, Tommy Olsen and Anders Hauge. He finished 12th in the middle distance and 6th in the sprint distance at the 2004 world championships.

He also won a silver medal at the 2010 Winter Military World Games.

Tonna is a double national champion in ski orienteering.

References

Norwegian orienteers
Male orienteers
Ski-orienteers
1975 births
Living people
20th-century Norwegian people
21st-century Norwegian people